Wind on the Water is the second album by Crosby & Nash, released on ABC Records in 1975. Cassette and 8-track tape versions of the album were distributed by Atlantic Records, to which Crosby, Stills, Nash & Young were signed. It peaked at No. 6 on the Billboard 200 album chart and was certified gold by the RIAA. Three singles were released from the album, "Carry Me", "Take the Money and Run", and "Love Work Out", of which only the first charted, peaking at No. 52 on the Billboard Hot 100 singles chart.

Background
After the summer 1974 tour by Crosby, Stills, Nash & Young, the quartet made a second attempt at a new CSNY studio album. Like the attempt from 1973, this proved fruitless, although the track "Through My Sails" showed up on the 1975 Zuma album by Neil Young. The quartet pursued their own directions, Young forming a new version of Crazy Horse to record Zuma, and Stephen Stills resuming his solo career with a new album in early 1975. David Crosby and Graham Nash opted to reactivate the partnership that had yielded tours in 1971 and 1973 and an album in 1972. This time they made it a going concern, signing a three-album deal with ABC Records, of which this album was the first of their contract.

Content
As on their debut album, most of the instrumental backing was provided by the group of session musicians known as The Section. This quartet consisting of keyboardist Craig Doerge, guitarist Danny Kortchmar, bassist Leland Sklar, and drummer Russell Kunkel, along with multi-instrumentalist David Lindley and bassist Tim Drummond, would be dubbed by Crosby as 'The Mighty Jitters' and provide support for the duo both on stage and in the studio for the remainder of the decade. Sessions for the album took place at Rudy Recorders in San Francisco, and the Sound Lab and Village Recorders in Los Angeles.

Entering their mid-thirties, Crosby and Nash explored darker, trenchant themes in their lyrics for this album, "Carry Me" referencing the death of Crosby's mother, with "Wind on the Water" an elegiac plea concerning the slaughter of whales. As usual, songs topics included personal issues and friends: "Mama Lion" purportedly about Joni Mitchell; "Cowboy of Dreams" about Young; and "Take the Money and Run" concerning the financial aftermath to the mammoth CSNY 1974 tour. Two songs feature the first issued writing collaborations of Nash and Crosby. The one on side two that closes the album, "To the Last Whale...", links two separate compositions: an a cappella sketch by Crosby "Critical Mass", into the title track by Nash.

Wind on the Water was reissued for compact disc on January 11, 2000, on MCA Records. On April 24, 2001, the album was repackaged as Bittersweet on the European budget label Hallmark Records from a second-generation master tape and issued in Europe only. In 2002, the album was released in the Netherlands for European distribution under the title The Magic Collection : Crosby and Nash, on the low-budget label ABC Records, in the series "The Magic Collection" (a division of Telesonic Holland). There was a vinyl-only reissue of the original album on Invisible Hands Music in August 2016.

In 2008, the album was reissued with a live concert from an FM broadcast recorded at the San Francisco Civic Auditorium, 14 December 1974 at a concert to benefit the United Farmworkers' Union and Project Jonah.

Track listing

Side one

Side two

2008 bonus disc

Personnel
 
David Crosby — vocals; electric guitar on "Carry Me", "Mama Lion", "Love Work Out", "Low Down Payment", "Homeward Through the Haze" and "Fieldworker"; twelve-string guitar on "Carry Me"; guitar on "Naked in the Rain"; acoustic piano on "Bittersweet"
 Graham Nash — vocals; electric guitar on "Mama Lion", "Low Down Payment" and "Cowboy of Dreams"; acoustic piano on "Love Work Out", "Fieldworker" and "To the Last Whale..."; Hammond organ on "Homeward Through the Haze"; congas on "Naked in the Rain"

Additional personnel
 Craig Doerge — electric piano on "Bittersweet", "Naked in the Rain", "Low Down Payment", "Homeward Through the Haze" and "To the Last Whale..."; acoustic piano on "Carry Me", "Mama Lion", "Low Down Payment" and "Cowboy of Dreams"; Hammond organ on "Love Work Out" 
 Carole King — Hammond organ on "Bittersweet"; backing vocals, acoustic piano on "Homeward Through the Haze"
 Stan Szelest — electric piano on "Fieldworker"
 David Lindley — slide guitar on "Mama Lion", "Take the Money and Run", "Naked in the Rain", "Love Work Out", "Low Down Payment" and "Fieldworker"; fiddle on "Take the Money and Run" and "Cowboy of Dreams"
 Danny Kortchmar — electric guitar on "Mama Lion", "Bittersweet", "Take the Money and Run", "Naked in the Rain", "Love Work Out" and "Low Down Payment"
 Joel Bernstein — guitar on "Mama Lion" and "Naked in the Rain"; backing vocals on "Cowboy of Dreams"
 James Taylor — guitar on "Carry Me" and "To the Last Whale..."; backing vocals on "To the Last Whale..."
 Ben Keith — slide guitar on "Fieldworker"
 Tim Drummond — bass on "Mama Lion," "Take the Money and Run", "Naked in the Rain", "Love Work Out", "Cowboy of Dreams" and "Fieldworker"
 Leland Sklar — bass on "Carry Me", "Bittersweet", "Low Down Payment", "Homeward Through the Haze" and "To the Last Whale..."
 Russ Kunkel — drums on all tracks except "Fieldworker"; percussion on "Fieldworker"
 Levon Helm — drums on "Fieldworker"
 Jackson Browne — backing vocals on "Love Work Out"
 Jimmie Haskell — string arrangements on "Wind on the Water"
 Sid Sharp — orchestra leader on "Wind on the Water"

Production personnel
 Crosby & Nash — producers
 Stephen Barncard, Don Gooch — engineers
 Stanley Johnston — assistant engineer
 Gary Burden — art direction
 Joel Bernstein — photography
 Stephen Barncard, Mike Ragonga — reissue producers
 Erick Labson — remastering engineer

Charts 

Singles

Certification

Tour

References

External links
 Crosby & Nash

1975 albums
ABC Records albums
Albums produced by David Crosby
Albums produced by Graham Nash
Albums produced by Stephen Barncard
Crosby & Nash albums